Highway 80 is a north-south highway in southern Israel, east of Beersheba. It connects Ar'arat an-Naqab in the south to Metzadot Yehuda in the north. It is 34 km long.

Junctions &Interchanges on the highway

See also
 List of highways in Israel

80